John Thomas "J. T." Smith (born October 29, 1955) is a former professional American football player who played in the National Football League from 1978 to 1990.  A 6'2", 185-lb. undrafted wide receiver and punt returner from the University of North Texas, Smith played for the Washington Redskins, the Kansas City Chiefs, and the St.Louis/Phoenix Cardinals.  His best year as a professional came during the strike shortened 1987 season for the Cardinals when he led the NFL with 91 receptions for 1,117 yards.

On May 17, 2011, Smith was named the interim head coach of the Iowa Barnstormers in the Arena Football League. He remained the head coach until the conclusion of the season.

References

1955 births
Living people
People from Leonard, Texas
American football wide receivers
American football return specialists
North Texas Mean Green football players
Washington Redskins players
Kansas City Chiefs players
St. Louis Cardinals (football) players
Phoenix Cardinals players
American Conference Pro Bowl players
National Conference Pro Bowl players
Iowa Barnstormers coaches
National Football League replacement players